Trade industry may refer to:

 Trade, the exchange of goods
 Trade association 
 Retail industry
 Activity related to providing trade (occupation)
 Department of Trade and Industry (disambiguation), a division of government